Naqi may refer to:

People
 Ali Naqi (disambiguation), an Arabic masculine given name
 Syed Ali Naqi Naqvi Qumi, ayatollah of Pakistan
 Mohammad Ali Naqi, Bangladeshi architect
 Muhammad Mehdi ibn Ali Naqi, Persian physician from Isfahan
 Naqi Ali Khan (1830–1880)
 Näqi İsänbät (1899–1992), Tatar writer

Places
 Naqi al-Fardah, village in western central Yemen